Iuri José Picanço Medeiros (born 10 July 1994) is a Portuguese professional footballer who plays for S.C. Braga as a winger.

He achieved Primeira Liga figures of over 100 games and 30 goals, for Sporting CP and Braga as well as loans to Arouca, Moreirense and Boavista. He also had brief spells in Italy, Poland and Germany, and won the 2020–21 Taça de Portugal with Braga.

Medeiros earned 56 caps and scored six goals for Portugal's youth teams.

Club career

Sporting CP
Born in Horta, Azores, Medeiros joined Sporting CP's youth system in 2005, aged 11. He went on to spend three full seasons with their reserves in the Segunda Liga, his debut as a professional arriving of on 11 August 2012 as he came on as a 62nd-minute substitute for Filipe Chaby in a 1−0 away loss against U.D. Oliveirense.

Medeiros was loaned to F.C. Arouca in the 2015 January transfer window, playing his first game in the Primeira Liga on the 18th in a 1−0 defeat at Moreirense FC. He subsequently served two season-long top division loans, at Moreirense and Boavista FC. While at the service of the former, he scored his first goal in the competition on 25 September 2015 to help to a 2−2 home draw with FC Porto and, on 12 March 2017, netted a brace to help the latter defeat C.S. Marítimo 3−0.

Returned to the Estádio José Alvalade for the 2017−18 campaign, Medeiros made his competitive debut for Sporting's first team on 15 August 2017, playing the last minutes of the 0−0 home draw against FC Steaua București in the UEFA Champions League play-off round. He was, however, quickly deemed surplus to requirements by manager Jorge Jesus.

On 25 January 2018, Medeiros signed with Genoa C.F.C. on loan until June 2019, with the Italian club having the option to make the move permanent for €10 million. He made his Serie A debut on 5 February, playing 25 minutes in a 2−1 away win over S.S. Lazio. He scored his first goal for his new team on 3 April in his first start, helping the hosts to defeat Cagliari Calcio 2−1 with a last-minute effort.

On 3 February 2019, Medeiros joined Legia Warsaw on loan. On 19 July, he cut ties with Sporting and moved to 1. FC Nürnberg of the German 2. Bundesliga on a four-year deal.

Braga
Medeiros returned to Portugal on 28 July 2020, agreeing to a one-year loan at S.C. Braga with an option to buy. He won the Taça de Portugal in his first season, scoring in a 7–0 victory at Clube Olímpico do Montijo in the fourth round on 14 December.

On 29 January 2021, Medeiros suffered a severe left knee sprain in a Taça da Liga match against C.D. Santa Clara, ruling him out for six months. Nonetheless, he was rewarded in April for his six goals and five assists with a five-year contract; the fee was €800,000 and the buyout clause €30 million.

Medeiros scored and set up Ricardo Horta on 24 February 2022 as Braga turned around a deficit against FC Sheriff Tiraspol in the last 32 of the UEFA Europa League. On 14 April, in extra time during the second leg of  quarter-final against Rangers, he was sent off for dissent after shouting at referee François Letexier who had booked him for a late challenge on Leon Balogun; as a result, he was not selected by coach Carlos Carvalhal for the next league fixture in order to "reflect upon his actions".

International career
Medeiros participated in two UEFA European Under-21 Championship editions with Portugal. In 2015, he collected four substitute appearances for the runners-up.

Medeiros was also selected by coach Rui Jorge for the Portugal Olympic team in a friendly 4–0 win over Mexico on 28 March 2016; the game was held in Angra do Heroísmo on his native archipelago. He was overlooked for the final squad for the tournament in Brazil months later.

Career statistics

Club

Honours
Sporting CP
Taça da Liga: 2017–18

Braga
Taça de Portugal: 2020–21

Portugal
UEFA European Under-21 Championship runner-up: 2015

References

External links

1994 births
Living people
People from Faial Island
Portuguese footballers
Association football wingers
Primeira Liga players
Liga Portugal 2 players
Sporting CP B players
Sporting CP footballers
F.C. Arouca players
Moreirense F.C. players
Boavista F.C. players
S.C. Braga players
Serie A players
Genoa C.F.C. players
Ekstraklasa players
Legia Warsaw players
2. Bundesliga players
1. FC Nürnberg players
Portugal youth international footballers
Portugal under-21 international footballers
Portuguese expatriate footballers
Expatriate footballers in Italy
Expatriate footballers in Poland
Expatriate footballers in Germany
Portuguese expatriate sportspeople in Italy
Portuguese expatriate sportspeople in Poland
Portuguese expatriate sportspeople in Germany